Birds described in 1892 include the Laysan honeycreeper, Abyssinian crimsonwing, Chatham raven, black oriole, Tullberg's woodpecker, spotted nightjar, Hose's broadbill , Bolivian earthcreeper, Chubb's cisticola, greater ground robin, streak-throated hermit, green-breasted bushshrike and the Gough moorhen.

Events
Foundation of the British Ornithologists' Club
Death of Henry Walter Bates
Ernst Hartert becomes curator of birds at the Tring Museum
First issue of Bulletin of the British Ornithologists' Club online

Publications
Henry Ogg Forbes (1892). "Preliminary notice of additions to the extinct Avifauna of New Zealand. (Abstract.)". Transactions and Proceedings of the New Zealand Institute. 24: 185–189.
Adolphe Boucard (1892–1895). Genera of Humming Birds: Being Also a Complete Monograph of These Birds. London.
Charles Dixon (1892). The Migration of Birds: An Attempt to Reduce Avian Season-Flight to Law. London: Chapman and Hall.
Charles B. Cory (1892). Catalogue of West Indian Birds, Containing a List of All Species Known to Occur in the Bahama Islands, the Greater Antilles, the Caymans, and the Lesser Antilles, Excepting the Islands of Tobago and Trinidad. Boston. The author.

Ongoing events
Osbert Salvin and Frederick DuCane Godman (1879–1904). Biologia Centrali-Americana. Aves.
Richard Bowdler Sharpe (1874–1898). Catalogue of the Birds in the British Museum London.
Eugene W. Oates and William Thomas Blanford (1889–1898). The Fauna of British India, Including Ceylon and Burma: Birds Volumes I–IV.
Anton Reichenow, Bror Yngve Sjöstedt, and other members of the German Ornithologists' Society in Journal für Ornithologie.
The Ibis
Ornis; internationale Zeitschrift für die gesammte Ornithologie.Vienna 1885-1905online BHL
The Auk online BHL

References

Bird
Birding and ornithology by year